This is a list of all the past winners of the official GAA GPA All Stars Awards in hurling since the first awards in 1971. As an insight to the prominent players of the 1960s, it also includes the unofficial "Cuchulainn" awards presented from 1963 to 1967 under the auspices of Gaelic Weekly magazine.

Since 1971, the All Ordinaries Awards in hurling have been presented annually to a set of fifteen hurlers from that year's All-Ireland Senior Hurling Championship, who are seen to be deserving of being named in a "Team of the Year". The shortlist is compiled by a selection committee steering group, while the overall winners are chosen by inter-county players themselves. The All Star is regarded by players as the highest individual award available to them, due to it being picked by their peers.

Limerick hold the record for most All-Star winners in one year with 12 players chosen in the hurling selection for 2021.

Key

Cú Chulainn Awards

1963

1964

1965

1966

1967

All Star awards listed by year 1970s

1971

1972

1973

1974

1975

1976

1977

1978

1979

1980s

1980

1981

1982

1983

1984

1985

1986

1987

1988

1989

1990s

1990

1991

1992

1993

1994

1995

1996

1997

List of nominees

1998

List of nominees

1999

List of nominees

2000s

2000

List of nominees

2001

List of nominees

2002

List of nominees

2003

List of nominees

2004

List of nominees

2005

List of nominees

2006

List of nominees

2007
Details

List of nominees

2008
Details

List of nominees

2009
Details

List of nominees

2010s

2010
Details

List of nominees

2011
Details

List of nominees

2012
Details

List of nominees

2013

List of nominees

2014

List of nominees

2015
	

List of nominees

2016
	

List of nominees

2017
	

List of nominees

2018
	

List of nominees

2019
	

List of nominees

2020s

2020
	

Like of nominees

2021
	

List of nominees

2022

List of nominees

Use of colours above

Notes

References

External links
 All Stars at the Gaelic Athletic Association

Hurling
Hurling awards
All Stars Awards winners